Dragon's Tail, dragon tail, etc. may refer to the tail of a dragon.

Dragon's Tail may also refer to:

Astronomy
 Dragon's Tail (lunar), an alternate name for the descending lunar node in astronomy and astrology
 Ketu (mythology), the personification of the descending lunar node in Hindu astronomy, astrology, and religion
 Dragon's Tail (Chinese constellation), another name of the Chinese mansion Tail (near Scorpio) in the constellation of the Azure Dragon
 Dragon's Tail (star), another name for Thuban in the constellation Draco, which was the pole star from 3942 to 1793 BC

Places
 Dragon's Tail (peninsula), a phantom feature appearing east of the Golden Chersonese in Ptolemaic and Islamic maps for centuries
 Yongmunso, Korea, a site supposedly dug by a dragon's tail
 Mokoliʻi, Hawaiʻi, USA, supposedly the remains of a dragon or lizard's tail
 Kontuey Neak (Khmer for "Dragon Tail"), a Cambodian rain forest
 Bạch Long Vĩ island (Viet for "White Dragon Tail"), a Vietnamese island
 Dragons Tail, a ridge near Bearhat Mountain in Montana, United States
 The Dragon's Tail (road), an informal name for a winding stretch of U.S. Route 129 in North Carolina and Tennessee
 The Dragon's Tail (trail), a winding stretch of the Forest of Dean in Gloucester in the United Kingdom
 "The Dragon's Tail", an occasional name for the Strait of Magellan

Other
 dragon's tail fern (Asplenium × ebenoides)
 Dragon's Tail (tincture), an alternate name for the tincture sanguine
 "A Dragon's Tail" (episode) (2006), an episode of the Jane and the Dragon television series
 A Dragon's Tail (2008), a book in the Jane and the Dragon series of books by Martin Baynton
 "Dragon's Tail" (episode) (2006), an episode of GoGo Sentai Boukenger
 The Dragon's Tail (play) by Douglas Watkinson (1985)
 Dragon's Tail, the poop deck of the Dawn Treader in C. S. Lewis's Narnia series
 Dragon's Tail, a set of speed slides at Six Flags White Water in Atlanta, Georgia, in the United States
 Dragon's Tail, Yukimura Sanada's spear in the Samurai Warriors series

See also
 Mission Incredible: Adventures on the Dragon's Trail (2012), a movie in the Pleasant Goat and Big Big Wolf series
 Under the Dragon's Tail (book) (1998), a novel in Maureen Jennings's Detective Murdoch series
 Under the Dragon's Tail (film) (2005), a film adaptation of Jenning's book
 "Biting the Dragon's Tail" (1995), a single by Jonathan Saul Kane
 Tickling the Dragon's Tail, a 1946 failed experiment to test the exact point at which fissile material could be made critical, after which hands-on criticality experiments were discontinued in the United States
 Chasing the Dragon’s Tail (1991), a book by Alan Rabinowitz about saving wild cats in Thailand
 Fuxi and Nüwa, figures in Chinese mythology often depicted as jiaolong with dragon or serpent tails instead of legs
 Ouroboros, the serpent or dragon which devours its own tail
 Pistis Sophia, a Gnostic text
 "Ode on Melancholy" (1819), a poem by John Keats